Patricia Nava (born 31 August 1948) is a Mexican volleyball player. She competed in the women's tournament at the 1968 Summer Olympics.

References

External links
 

1948 births
Living people
Mexican women's volleyball players
Olympic volleyball players of Mexico
Volleyball players at the 1968 Summer Olympics
Sportspeople from Guadalajara, Jalisco
Pan American Games medalists in volleyball
Pan American Games bronze medalists for Mexico
Medalists at the 1971 Pan American Games
Medalists at the 1975 Pan American Games